Jama is a city in Ecuador, capital of Jama Canton, in the northwest of Manabí Province. It is located at kilometer 371 of Ecuador Highway 15 on right bank of the Jama River.

References

Populated places in Manabí Province